City Park can refer to:

 urban park, a park in the city

Parks
City Park, Launceston, Tasmania, Australia
Stadtpark, Vienna, Austria; aka City Park
City Park (Budapest), Hungary
City Park, City of Langley, Langley Township, British Columbia, Canada
Assiniboine Park, Winnipeg, Manitoba, Canada; formerly named City Park
City Park, Tehran, Iran
City Park (Luxembourg City), Luxembourg; a park in central Luxembourg City
City Park, Penang, Malaysia
City Park, Zemun, Belgrade, Serbia
City Park (Kyiv), Ukraine
Eastside City Park, Birmingham, England, United Kingdom; a planned urban park

United States
 City Park, Denver, Colorado; a park
 City Park (New Orleans), Louisiana; a park
 City Park, California, Missouri
 Commodore Barry Park, Fort Greene, Brooklyn, New York City, New York; formerly called City Park
 Washington Park (Portland, Oregon), originally named City Park in 1871

Places
 City Park, Saskatoon, Manitoba, Canada; a neighbourhood

United States
 City Park, Benicia, California
 Balboa Park (San Diego), California; formerly called City Park
 City Park, Denver, Colorado; a neighborhood
 City Park, Houston, Texas
 City Park, New Orleans, Louisiana, a neighborhood

Facilities
 Parque de la Ciudad, Villa Soldati, Buenos Aires, Argentina; a former amusement park; aka City Park
 City Park Ice Rink, Budapest, Hungary
 City Park (Delhi Metro), Delhi, India; a subway station
 City Park Hockey Stadium, Nairobi, Kenya; a field hockey pitch
 City Park Mall, Constanta, Romania; a shopping centre
 City Park, Edinburgh, Scotland, United Kingdom; a defunct soccer football ground

United States
 Citypark (St. Louis), a soccer stadium in St. Louis, Missouri, United States
 City Park Golf, Denver, Colorado, United States; a golf course
 City Park Golf Course, Baton Rouge, Louisiana, United States; a golf course
 City Park (Bradenton), Florida, United States; the original name of McKechnie Field baseball field
 City Park/Pepsi Tennis Center, New Orleans, Louisiana, United States
 City Park Race Track, New Orleans, Louisiana, United States; a horseracing track
 Tad Gormley Stadium, New Orleans, Louisiana, United States; a multipurpose stadium formerly called City Park Stadium
 City Park Stadium, New Rochelle, New York, United States; a soccer stadium

 City Park Brewery, Philadelphia, Pennsylvania, United States; a defunct brewery

Other uses
 City Park (1934 film), an American comedy-drama film
 City Park (1951 film), an Austrian comedy-drama film
 City Parks Foundation, New York City, New York, United States; an independent non-profit concerned with the City of New York's parks
 City Park Radio, Launceston, Tasmania, Australia; a radio station

See also

 City Park West, Denver, Colorado, United States; a neighborhood
 Royal National City Park of Sweden; a city park network
 Big City Park, Ormeau Park, Belfast, Northern Ireland, United Kingdom; a televised live puppet show on BBC
 City of Parks, Louisville, Kentucky, United States; an urban development plan
 Cities in the Park, Heaton Park, Manchester, England, UK; a music festival
 Kiel-Hassee CITTI-PARK station; the transit station "Citti-Park" in the Hasse district of Kiel in Germany
 Citti Park, several shopping centres in Germany, see List of shopping malls in Germany
 
 Park City (disambiguation)
 City (disambiguation)
 Park (disambiguation)